Fox Creek is a stream in Franklin and 
St. Louis counties in the U.S. state of Missouri. It is a tributary of the Meramec River.
 
Fox Creek was named for the abundance of foxes near its course.

See also
List of rivers of Missouri

References

Rivers of Franklin County, Missouri
Rivers of St. Louis County, Missouri
Rivers of Missouri